The 1980–81 Midland Football Combination season was the 44th in the history of Midland Football Combination, a football competition in England.

Division One

Division One featured 18 clubs which competed in the division last season along with two new clubs, promoted from Division Two:
Hurley Daw Mill Miners Welfare
Smethwick Highfield

League table

References

1980–81
8